The Allgemeines Deutsches Kommersbuch (ADK) or Lahrer Kommersbuch is the most popular commercium book in Germany. It was first published in 1858 and came up to its 166th edition in 2013.  It is the German equivalent of the Flemish studentencodex.

External links
s:de:Allgemeines Deutsches Kommersbuch in the German Wikisource project.

Commercium songs
1858 establishments in Germany
1858 in music
Publications established in 1858
Song books